The Johnny Cash Museum opened in April 2013 in Nashville, Tennessee, to honor the life and music of the country superstar often referred to as the "Man in Black". It houses the world's largest collection of Johnny Cash memorabilia and artifacts, including a stone wall taken from his lake house in Hendersonville, Tennessee, and is officially authorized by Cash's estate.

History 
Born in 1932 in Kingsland, Arkansas, Johnny Cash is one of the bestselling recording artists of all time. Throughout his lifetime, he wrote and recorded music in a lot of different styles, including country, rockabilly, gospel, blues, and rock and roll, and he has been inducted into the Rock and Roll Hall of Fame, the Gospel Music Hall of Fame, the Country Music Hall of Fame, the Nashville Songwriters Hall of Fame, and the Memphis Music Hall of Fame. His trademark nickname – Man in Black – came from the signature all-black wardrobe he wore for performances.

The original museum honoring the star – known as House of Cash – was in Hendersonville, Tennessee, and although Cash lived in the same town for over thirty years, he did not live in the museum. The House of Cash had been closed for many years and had fallen into a state of disrepair, and appeared in Cash's music video "Hurt".

Cash's lakeside home in Hendersonville, that he lived in from 1968 until his death, burned in an accidental fire during renovations in 2007. Shannon and Bill Miller – personal friends of Cash – donated their personal collection of memorabilia to found the current Johnny Cash Museum in Nashville. The museum opened to the public in 2013 with the restored original House of Cash sign as one of its exhibits.

Location and site details 
The 18,000-square-foot museum is located in the busy South of Broadway (SoBro) neighborhood, near 4th Avenue North and the Broadway Avenue SB bus station and at Stop 3 on the Old Town Trolley Tour. It is open daily (except Thanksgiving and Christmas) and charges admission for anyone 6 years and older.

Besides exhibits, the museum site has a gift shop stocked with Johnny Cash souvenirs and collectibles, a café and coffee shop, and event space for hosting parties, meetings, banquets, weddings, corporate events, and more. The space is large enough for 200 standing guests or 114 seated guests. Cash's personal chili recipe is served at the onsite café.

A museum expansion took place in 2016 to add interactive exhibits, such as technology centers to create mixes of Cash's songs and listen to covers of his music by dozens of artists. Visitors can also pose in front of a green screen to take photos with Cash to take home. The site is wheelchair accessible but does not have its own private parking reserved for museum visitors. Limited street parking is available in the area.

Exhibits 
The Johnny Cash Museum chronicles Cash's life, from his early years and Air Force career to his personal life and music career, including memorabilia from his famous prison concerts. Exhibits are arranged in chronological order, with more than 1,000 artifacts on display, consisting of personal items, memorabilia, and interactive exhibits. One example is the "Progression of Sound" exhibit, which focuses on Cash's crossovers into different styles and genres of music on various types of recording media, including LPs, 8-tracks, and CDs.

Another section focuses on Sun Records, the Memphis label that helped launch Cash's career – along with the careers of Elvis Presley, Jerry Lee Lewis, Roy Orbison, and many others. Besides items belonging to Cash, other items in this section include a pair of glasses worn by Roy Orbison, a microphone used by Elvis Presley, and the drum set belonging to "Fluke" Holland – Cash's friend and drummer for 40 years. (The set was also the first full drum set used on the Grand Ole Opry stage.) Visitors can play video footage of his collaborations with other legendary performers.

An exhibit that focuses on his TV and movie career includes clips of Cash hosting his own variety show, clips of his appearances on Dr. Quinn, Medicine Woman and Hee Haw, and various props and costumes from the movie Walk the Line as well as several of Cash's movies. Movie and show posters are also on display.

According to Cash's family, he used a folded dollar bill threaded through the strings of his guitar to mimic a percussion sound in the years before he had a drummer. That Martin guitar – with the dollar bill still threaded through the strings – is on display at the museum along with numerous other artifacts, including:

 Stage costumes, including his infamous prison jumpsuit costume
 Handwritten letters and notes
 Handwritten lyrics, including the lyrics from the last song he wrote days before his death
 Yearbook page
 Vintage guitar amps
 Air Force uniform and other Air Force memorabilia
 Gold and platinum records
 Numerous music instruments
 School report cards 
 Cash family piano 
 Highwaymen memorabilia 
 Grammy and CMA awards
 Bag of cotton from childhood home in Dyess, Arkansas
 Personal belongings, such as photographs, items from his home, and his personal bible 
 Birth certificate 
 Future Farmers of America card

The most recent full exhibit – added in February 2018 – focuses on Cash's all-black look and his history with the man who helped him create it, Manuel Cuevas. Called "The Man in Black: The Style of Johnny Cash, Curated by Manuel", the exhibit includes stage costumes, regular clothing, and measurement notes taken by Cuevas, who started out working for Nudie Cohn – the maker of the famous rhinestone "Nudie suits" for stars – early in his career.

In May 2018, Cash's first gold record – "I Walk the Line" – was put on display after being recovered from a European collector. The record is now certified double platinum. The final exhibit near the exit of the museum plays the music video for "Hurt" – Cash's cover of the popular Nine Inch Nails song and his final music video.

Recognition 
The Johnny Cash Museum has received some recognition from various travel-based organizations since its opening. It is one of only six attractions in Nashville to earn a AAA Gem rating, and both National Geographic and Forbes rank it near the top of their lists for travel destinations. The museum is #5 on U.S. News & World Report's list of "Best Things to Do in Nashville" and is rated a kid-friendly site by Nashville Parent magazine. Additionally, the museum was on TripAdvisor's list of Top 25 Trending U.S. Attractions for Summer 2017 and also its list of Top 10 Trending U.S. Attractions for Fall 2017.

Conde Nast Traveler (Worldwide) rates it the #1 Must Visit Museum for Music Lovers, and Forbes calls it the #1 Must See Nashville Destination. It is the #1 Pitch Perfect Museum according to National Geographic (Worldwide) and is one of the Top 10 Best Attractions in Nashville according to USA Today. Former U.S. Vice President Al Gore – a Tennessee native – called it a "world-class museum, a major tourist attraction, and a major tourist destination for the millions of people that love Johnny Cash – a world class collection."

Additional published recognition by media sources include:

 Top 5 Museums Dedicated to Pop-Rock Music (Worldwide) – Marie Claire
 Top 3 Best Things to Do in Nashville – Orbitz
 7 Great American Vacation Spots (That Won't Bust Your Budget) – Time
 22 Reasons You Should Visit Nashville – Huffington Post
 Top 10 Tennessee Spots for Music Lovers – Rolling Stone
 Best Culture Stop in Nashville – Money Magazine

See also
 List of music museums

References 

 

Johnny Cash
Music museums in Tennessee
Museums in Nashville, Tennessee
Organizations established in 2013
Museums established in 2013
2013 establishments in Tennessee
Biographical museums in Tennessee
Country music museums